Acrophyllum may refer to:

Acrophyllum (plant), a plant genus
Acrophyllum, a common misspelling of the katydid genus name Acyrophyllum